Ağaverdioba is a village and municipality in the Khachmaz Rayon of Azerbaijan.  It has a population of 549.

References 

Populated places in Khachmaz District